The Paniya, also known as Paniyar and Paniyan, are an ethnic group of India. They constitutes the single largest Scheduled Tribe in Kerala and are mainly found in the Wayanad District and the neighboring areas of Karnataka. They primarily inhabit villages around edge of forestland in Kerala's Wayanad, Kozhikode, Kannur and Malappuram districts. The Paniya speak the Paniya language, which belongs to the Dravidian family, closely related to Malayalam. A scheduled tribe, they have a population of around 94,000 (Sex ratio 1057). There is a theory that the Paniyas were brought to Wayand by the Jain Gounders who trained them to be agricultural laborers in their fields (Thurston, 1909). The center of the bonding contracts was the famous temple of the regional Mother Goddess of the Valliyoorkkavu shrine near Mananthavady.

History

The Paniya have historically worked as agricultural labourers. They are believed to have been brought to Wayanad by the king of Malabar, and thereafter tilled the land as serfs. Following the abolishment of the slave-holding system, the Paniya were resettled in different areas established by the government.

Paniyas were also historically reputed for their boldness and recklessness. For this reason, they were often employed as thieves.

The Paniya today are a scheduled tribe. One particular sub-group of theirs, the Kattupaniyar, inhabits the forest region of Nilambur in the Malappuram District. Here, members lead a traditional hunter-gatherer lifestyle.

Demographics
The Paniya mainly inhabit Kerala, and the Wayanad, Kozhikode, Kannur and Malappuram districts of India. Others reside in Tamil Nadu, the area west of the Nilgiris hills, as well as the Kodagu District of Karnataka. Their total population depends on agriculture and agriculture labor for their livelihood.

Their population has remained unchanged during this decade (2003). and nearly 67,948 live in the Kerala hills, notably fringes of Western Ghats.  People's Action for Educational and Economic development of Tribal People (PEEP) which has been working among Paniya settlers of Kerala since 2005 to promote literacy and improving economic status of the group.

Language
The Paniya speak the Paniya language as a mother tongue. A member of the Dravidian family, it is most closely related to Malayalam, Kadar, Ravula and other Dravidian languages.

Paniya is spoken both at home and during religious ceremonies. Some Paniyas also use other Dravidian languages such as Malayalam, Tamil or Kannada.

Paniyas use different writing systems depending on where in India they reside. Those in Karnataka use the Kannada script, those in Kerala write in the Malayalam script, while the Paniya in Tamil Nadu use the Tamil script.

Culture

Paniyas typically live in villages (padis) consisting of a few huts (pire or chala) with courtyards. Each hut settlement contains 5 to 15 families.

For attire, Paniya males wear a lengthy cloth wrapped around the waist, which is known as a mundu. A smaller mundu is also slung over the shoulders to cover the body. Paniya females or panichi don a long cloth, with a smaller one above the breast area and around the armpits. In addition, they wear a red or black aratti scarf around the waist. Land grabbers and poachers exploit them by encouraging drinking habit, sexual infidelity and other vices. PEEP Wayanad also organises various events to spread awareness on social menaces like alcoholism and chewing tobacco. Street plays in the local language has been staged at several forest settlements.

The Paniyas bury their dead in formal funeral rites. Typically, the place of burial is close to the padi. The interment is accompanied by a seven-day mourning period by family members.

Religion
The modern Paniya practice a variety of faiths. Among these are Hinduism, traditional religion, and Christianity.

Genetics

Genetic studies, such as Yelmen et al. 2019, showed that the Paniya people, the Irula people, and the Soliga people, are the best modern proxy for the Ancient South Asian hunter-gatherers, deriving most of their ancestry from this lineage, which diverged from the common ancestor of East Asian and Andamanese peoples.

See also
Irulas
Soliga tribe

References

External links

Paniya: A Language of India

Indigenous peoples of South Asia
Social groups of Karnataka
Dravidian peoples
Social groups of Kerala
People from Kannur district
People from Kozhikode district
People from Malappuram district
People from Wayanad district